Conchita Martínez was the two-time defending champion and successfully defended her title, defeating Arantxa Sánchez Vicario in the final, 6–3, 6–1.

Seeds
A champion seed is indicated in bold text while text in italics indicates the round in which that seed was eliminated. The top eight seeds received a bye to the second round.

  Arantxa Sánchez Vicario (final)
  Mary Pierce (semifinals)
  Conchita Martínez (champion)
  Gabriela Sabatini (third round)
  Anke Huber (third round)
  Mary Joe Fernández (quarterfinals)
  Brenda Schultz (second round)
  Iva Majoli (quarterfinals)
  Naoko Sawamatsu (second round)
  Amanda Coetzer (third round)
  Inés Gorrochategui (first round)
  Judith Wiesner (third round)
  Helena Suková (semifinals)
  Karina Habšudová (third round)
  Irina Spîrlea (third round)
  Nathalie Tauziat (third round)

Draw

Finals

Top half

Section 1

Section 2

Bottom half

Section 3

Section 4

References
 1995 Italian Open Draw

Singles
1995 Italian Open (tennis)